Serenity may refer to:

Arts and entertainment

Firefly franchise
 "Serenity" (Firefly episode), the 2002 pilot TV episode
 Serenity (Firefly vessel), the fictional spaceship
 Serenity (2005 film), a sequel to the Firefly television series
 Serenity (soundtrack)
 Serenity Role Playing Game, released in 2005
 Serenity (comics), published from 2005 to 2017
 Serenity: Those Left Behind, a 2005 three-issue comic book limited series
 Serenity: Better Days, a 2008 three-issue comic book miniseries
 Serenity: Leaves on the Wind, a 2014 six-issue comic book miniseries

Fictional characters
 Sailor Moon (character), also known as Princess Serenity and Neo-Queen Serenity, in the Sailor Moon media franchise
 Queen Serenity, in the Sailor Moon media franchise
 Serenity Johnson, in the TV series Halfway Home

Other arts and entertainment
 Serenity (2019 film), a thriller starring Matthew McConaughey, Anne Hathaway and Diane Lane
 Serenity (Clara), a public artwork by Josep Clarà, in Washington, D.C., United States

Music
 Serenity (band), an Austrian metal band founded in 2001
 Serenity (Kotipelto album), 2007
 Serenity (Blood for Blood album), 2004
 Serenity (Bobo Stenson album), 2000
 Serenity (Culture Beat album), 1993
 Serenity (Prosumer and Murat Tepeli album), 2008
 Serenity (Stan Getz album), 1989
 Serenity (EP), 2020 debut EP by Sena Kana
 "Serenity" (song), a song by Godsmack
 "Serenity", a song from Stronger Than Before by Olivia Newton-John
 "Serenity", a song from The Healing of Harms by Fireflight
 "Serenity", a song from Shivers by Armin van Buuren
 "Serenity", a song from Chimera by Delerium
 "Serenity", a song from Around the Sun by Jeff Watson

Other uses
 Sea of Serenity, a lunar mare
 Serenity Chasma, a feature on Pluto's moon Charon
 Serenity McKay (1997–2017), Indigenous Canadian murder victim
 Serenity (actress), American pornographic actress Sonya Elizabeth Lane (born 1969)
 Serenity (given name)
 Serenity High School, a substance-abuse recovery high school in McKinney, Texas, U.S.
 Serenity (style), a form of address for royalty or nobility
 SerenityOS, a free and open-source desktop operating system
 A planned future version of Ethereum

See also
 Serenity Prayer, a prayer by Reinhold Niebuhr
 Passaddhi (English: Serenity), a Pali-language Buddhist term
 Serene (disambiguation)